Xestia praevia is a moth of the family Noctuidae. It is found in Canada (New Brunswick, Quebec, Manitoba, Saskatchewan, Alberta and British Columbia) south to California. It is part of the elimata species group. Three of the species in this group (Xestia praevia, Xestia elimata and Xestia badicollis) have no significant difference in both genitals and DNA, suggesting they may be in fact one species.

This wingspan is about 32 mm. The moth flies from July to August depending on the location.

The larva feeds on Pinus ponderosa.

External links
Species info

Xestia
Moths of North America